Bloomington Township is a township in Decatur County, Iowa, USA. At the 2000 census, its population was 195.

History
Bloomington Township was named after Bloomington, Illinois, the former home of an early settler.

Geography
Bloomington Township covers an area of 35.68 square miles (92.42 square kilometers); of this, 0.08 square miles (0.19 square kilometers) or 0.21 percent is water. The stream of Pot Hole Creek runs through this township.

Unincorporated towns
 Tuskeego
(This list is based on USGS data and may include former settlements.)

Adjacent townships
 Grand River Township (north)
 Decatur Township (northeast)
 Burrell Township (east)
 New Buda Township (southeast)
 Fayette Township (south)
 Riley Township, Ringgold County (southwest)
 Athens Township, Ringgold County (west)
 Monroe Township, Ringgold County (northwest)

Cemeteries
The township contains two cemeteries: Elk and Lillie.

References
 U.S. Board on Geographic Names (GNIS)
 United States Census Bureau cartographic boundary files

External links
 US-Counties.com
 City-Data.com

Townships in Decatur County, Iowa
Townships in Iowa